In mathematics, the compact complement topology is a topology defined on the set  of real numbers, defined by declaring a subset  open if and only if it is either empty or its complement  is compact in the standard Euclidean topology on .

References

Topology